Monchaux-sur-Écaillon (literally Monchaux on Écaillon) is a commune in the Nord department in northern France.

Heraldry

See also
Communes of the Nord department

References

Monchauxsurecaillon